Emetullah Sultan ("servant of Allah"; 22 June 1701 – 19 April 1727), called also Ümmetullah Sultan or Heybetullah Sultan, was an Ottoman princess, the daughter of Sultan Mustafa II and Şehsuvar Kadin, the half sister of Mahmud I and the full sister of Osman III.

Life
Emetullah Sultan was born the 22 June 1701 in the Edirne Palace. Her father was the Ottoman Sultan Mustafa II, her mother one of his consorts, Şehsuvar Kadin. She had an older full brother, the future Osman III. Her name was given her in honor of the her paternal grandmother, Emetullah Rabia Gülnuş Sultan.  

After her father's deposition in 1703 when she was two years old, she settled in the Old Palace in Istanbul.

In 1720, her uncle Sultan Ahmed III arranged her marriage to Osman Pasha. Known by at least four different nicknames—Silâhdâr, Çerkes, Küçük, Sinek—Osman Pasha had risen from serving as a sword-bearer to her father, and had been previously married to her cousin Rukiye Sultan, who dead recently, a daughter of Fatma Sultan, who in turn was a daughter of Sultan Mehmed IV and so a sister of her father. The marriage took place on 13 September 1720 in the Old Palace.

The two together had a daughter, Hibetullah Hanımsultan, born in 1721who married Hacı Ali Pasha, and died in 1744. Hibetullah's descendants are still alive in XXI centuries. 

Emetullah was widowed at Osman Pasha's death in 1724.

Death
Emetullah Sultan died on 19 April 1727, and was buried in the mausoleum of New Mosque, Istanbul.

See also
List of Ottoman princesses

Ancestry

References

Sources

1701 births
1727 deaths
Royalty from Istanbul
18th-century Ottoman princesses